Twisted Metal: Black is a vehicular combat video game developed by Incognito Entertainment and published by Sony Computer Entertainment America for the PlayStation 2 video game console. Santa Monica Studio assisted on development. It is a reboot of the Twisted Metal series and was released on June 18, 2001. An online enabled multiplayer-only variant, Twisted Metal: Black Online, was released later as a free send-away.

Both Twisted Metal: Black and Twisted Metal: Black Online were reissued as part of Sony Greatest Hits program. A standard downloadable version of Twisted Metal: Black is included in the first batch of copies of Twisted Metal for PlayStation 3, discernible by the "Limited Edition" tab near the top of the cover art. In December 2015, the game was made available for the PlayStation 4 through the PlayStation Network.

Overview
In concept, Twisted Metal: Black is a demolition derby that permits the usage of ballistic projectiles. Players choose a vehicle and an arena—or a series of arenas in the story mode—to engage in battle with opposing drivers. A variety of weapons and upgrades are obtainable by pick-ups scattered throughout the stage. The objective of the game is to be the last one standing.

The basis of the plot follows the same structure as in all the previous games: Calypso runs a car-based contest called Twisted Metal (though in the game the contest is never called that), in which the various characters compete risking their lives to claim the tournament's prize - any single wish they desire, no matter the difficulty, rarity or even reality of such wish. Although Calypso is indeed malevolent, characters who have malevolent wishes (which make most of the cast) have their wishes granted without him tricking them on the wishes, while those seeking more noble ends (such as Outlaw's driver Agent Stone) find that Calypso usually has the last laugh.

In a somewhat different take from previous games, each character has their own story, which they narrate from their own point of view. Each of them starts with them being visited by Calypso, who knows what they desire and offers them in his contest. More of the characters' background is revealed in their midpoint cutscene, presented as a dream experienced when they briefly pass out after the sub-boss Minion is defeated. The characters' ending movie showing their wish being granted is presented after defeating the final boss Warhawk.

The game instead takes place within a single city known as "Midtown", with most competitors coming from the city's mental asylum, "Blackfield".

Twisted Metal: Black has a diverse cast made up from both new and returning characters, some of which have changed drastically from their previous appearances. There are a total of fifteen selectable characters, in which ten of them are selectable from the very beginning and the other five must be found and unlocked.

Reception

By July 2006, Twisted Metal: Black had sold 950,000 copies and earned $31 million in the United States. Next Generation ranked it as the 61st highest-selling game launched for the PlayStation 2, Xbox or GameCube between January 2000 and July 2006 in the States.

Twisted Metal: Black garnered critical acclaim. It received a rating of 9.5 out of 10 from GameSpot and a rating of 9.6 out of 10 from IGN. In GameSpot's Best and Worst of 2001, the game was nominated for Best Shooting Game, and came in ninth in their Game of the Year category. It was also nominated in the "Best Graphics, Artistic" category.

Many critics praised its dark and outstanding storylines for each character and its variety of weapons and unlockables, but its hover style controls for not changing much from the previous installments and its unbalanced difficulty were noted criticisms. Maxim gave the game all five stars and called it "a road rager's dream come true". Playboy gave it 90% and called it "fun for the whole family!" The Cincinnati Enquirer gave it four stars out of five and called it "a fight to the finish, so it's important to keep moving and to quickly learn how and when to use each of the weapons".

Daniel Erickson reviewed the PlayStation 2 version of the game for Next Generation, rating it five stars out of five, and stated that "the best car combat game in history is also the most creative. Go get it".

Twisted Metal: Black Online was a runner-up GameSpots 2002 "Best Online Game on PlayStation 2" award.

Twisted Metal: Harbor City

A sequel project is Twisted Metal: Harbor City, though it was never officially announced and the project was later scrapped.

Details on the game were revealed in the PlayStation 2 port of Twisted Metal: Head-On, Twisted Metal Head-On: Extra Twisted Edition. It was originally planned the levels of Harbor City to be greatly expanded and inter-connected with one another, giving a greater feeling of a single, complete world rather than stand-alone levels.

The four completed levels were included in the game as a bonus feature entitled Twisted Metal: Lost.

Webisodes
Animation S4, a producer of 3D and Flash animations, created a series of six original Flash "Webisodes" to promote the release of Twisted Metal: Black, beginning with No-Face, and including Billy Ray Stillwell, Dollface, Bloody Mary and Mr. Grimm.

Notes

References

External links 
 

2001 video games
Incognito Entertainment games
Multiplayer and single-player video games
PlayStation 2 games
PlayStation 2-only games
Sony Interactive Entertainment games
Split-screen multiplayer games
Twisted Metal
Vehicular combat games
Video game reboots
Video games developed in the United States
Video games scored by Kevin Manthei
Video games scored by Mike Reagan
Video games set in psychiatric hospitals